

2014 Sino-Australia Challenge 

Australia win series 2-2; 352-349 on points differential

Friendly

Bleu Blanc Tour 2014 Antibes

Bleu Blanc Tour 2014 Strasbourg

2014 FIBA World Cup

Preliminary round

Group D

Final round

Round of 16 

Australia men's national basketball team games
2014–15 in Australian basketball